Jochen Busse (born 28 January 1941 in Iserlohn) is a German television actor.

He began work as a stage actor at the Kammerspiele in Munich in 1960 and made his TV debut the same year. He has made 80 appearances in television since 1960. Jochen Busse was a member of the Münchner Lach- und Schießgesellschaft. In 1993 he appeared in the Austrian set comedy series Hochwürden erbt das Paradies. From 1996 until 2005 he was the host of the German Friday night comedy show 7 Tage, 7 Köpfe.

Selected filmography
  (1969)
 The Young Tigers of Hong Kong (1969)
 11 Uhr 20 (1970, TV miniseries)
  (1970)
 When the Mad Aunts Arrive (1970)
  (1970)
 Aunt Trude from Buxtehude (1971)
 Trouble with Trixie (1972)
 The Expulsion from Paradise (1977)
  (1983)
 The Wannsee Conference (1984)

External links

1941 births
Living people
German male television actors
20th-century German male actors
21st-century German male actors
People from Iserlohn
RTL Group people
German male film actors
German cabaret performers